Jing Ruixue (景瑞雪, Jǐng Ruìxuě, born July 4, 1988 in Xi'an) is a female wrestler from China.

She won the silver medal at the 2012 Summer Olympics in the women's 63 kg category.  She beat Choe Un-Gyong, Monika Michalik and Lyubov Volosova before losing in the final to defending champion Kaori Icho.

See also
China at the 2012 Summer Olympics

References

External links 
 Biography on fila-wrestling.com

Living people
1988 births
Chinese female sport wrestlers
Olympic silver medalists for China
Olympic medalists in wrestling
Wrestlers at the 2012 Summer Olympics
Olympic wrestlers of China
Sportspeople from Shaanxi
Sportspeople from Xi'an
Medalists at the 2012 Summer Olympics
World Wrestling Championships medalists
Asian Wrestling Championships medalists
21st-century Chinese women